Piple is a village development committee in Chitwan District in the Narayani Zone of southern Nepal. At the time of the 1991 Nepal census it had a population of 8,260 people living in 1,555 individual households.

References

Populated places in Chitwan District